Zach Johnson (born 1976) is an American golfer, winner of two major championships.

Zach or Zack Johnson may also refer to:
Zach J. Johnson, golf club professional; both Zach Johnsons played in the 2018 PGA Championship
Zach Johnson, keyboardist and one of the vocalist of American rock band, I See Stars
Zach Johnson (rugby league) (active from 2014), English player
Zack "Jick" Johnson, one of the creators of Kingdom of Loathing
Zachary Johnson (drummer), drummer
Zachary Scot Johnson, American singer-songwriter
Zack Johnson, see List of The Big Bang Theory characters